The third siege of Diu was a siege of the Portuguese Indian city of Diu by the Gujarat Sultanate in 1546. It ended with a major Portuguese victory.

Background 
At the beginning of the 16th century, the Muslim Sultanate of Gujarat was the principal seapower in India. Gujarat fought the Portuguese fleets in collaboration with the Mamluks. The Portuguese were defeated by a combined Mamluk-Gujarati fleet in 1508, which was in turn destroyed by a Portuguese fleet in the Battle of Diu (1509). By 1536, the Portuguese had gained complete control of Diu, while Gujarat was under attack from the Mughals.

In 1538, the Ottomans, who had taken over Egypt (1517) and Aden (1538), joined hands with the Gujarat Sultanate to launch an anti-Portuguese offensive. They besieged Diu in 1538, but had to retreat.

The siege 
After the failed siege of 1538, the Gujarati General Khadjar Safar besieged Diu again in an attempt to recapture the island. The siege lasted seven months from 20 April 1546 to 10 November 1546, during which João de Mascarenhas defended Diu.

The siege ended when a Portuguese fleet under Governor João de Castro arrived and routed the attackers.

Khadjar Safar and his son Muharram Rumi Khan (who were probably of Albanian origin) were both killed during the siege.

See also
 Siege of Diu
 Siege of Diu (1531)

 Catarina Lopes
 Isabel Madeira

References 

Diu 2
History of Daman and Diu
Gujarat Sultanate
1546 in India
Conflicts in 1546
16th century in Portuguese India